Stephen Buyl (born 2 September 1992) is a Belgian professional footballer who plays as a winger for Rupel Boom.

Career
On 27 July 2020, Buyl joined Roeselare on a deal until the summer 2023 with an option for one further year. He left the club in September 2020, after its bankruptcy without making an appearance. In November 2020, he joined lower league club Lokeren-Temse.

Buyl signed with Dutch Eerste Divisie club TOP Oss on 26 July 2021, where he was reunited with manager Bob Peeters, who had coached him at Westerlo. He made his debut on 6 August in a 1–0 league win over Excelsior, coming on as a substitute in the 74th minute for Joshua Sanches.  

On 9 June 2022, Buyl agreed to join Rupel Boom in the third-tier Belgian National Division 1.

References

External links

1992 births
Living people
Belgian footballers
Belgian expatriate footballers
Cercle Brugge K.S.V. players
S.V. Zulte Waregem players
Royal Antwerp F.C. players
K.V.C. Westerlo players
K.S.V. Roeselare players
TOP Oss players
K. Rupel Boom F.C. players
Belgian Pro League players
Challenger Pro League players
Eerste Divisie players
Association football wingers
Expatriate footballers in the Netherlands
Belgian expatriate sportspeople in the Netherlands
Sportspeople from Aalst, Belgium
Footballers from East Flanders